Josefine Gallmeyer (27 February 1838 in Leipzig – 3 February 1884 in Vienna) was an Austrian actress and theatre director of German origin.

Life 
Josefine Gallmeyer was the illegitimate daughter of the actress  with opera singer Michael Greiner. In 1842, she took the surname of her stepfather, Christian Gallmeyer.

In 1853, at the age of 15, Gallmeyer made her debut at the Brno City Theatre. Thereafter, she was employed by the United German Theatres theatre company in Budapest. However, her contract was terminated without notice after a short time because of disobedience and insubordination.

Back in Brno, she increasingly appeared as a parodist and was discovered by Johann Nepomuk Nestroy in 1856. After guesting at the Theater in der Josefstadt, Nestroy facilitated Gallmeyer's residency at the Carltheater in Vienna in 1857. This collaboration proved unfruitful and Gallmeyer returned to her work in Brno.

In addition to further performances in Brno, she gave guest performances in Sibiu and Timișoara. Friedrich Strampfer, the director of the German State Theatre Timișoara, engaged her there and further facilitated a tour of Germany. There, she guested at the Victoria-Theater in Berlin and at the Königliches Hoftheater in Dresden. In Dresden, her work was cut short after one performance due to erratic behavior. 

In 1862, Gallmeyer joined Strampfer in Vienna as he became director of the Theater an der Wien. There, she achieved her breakthrough with the posse of Ottokar Franz Ebersberg and Karl Costa.

In 1865, she returned to the Carltheater. Jacques Offenbach, from whom she expected a part, refused to write even one line for her. In 1875, she began to direct the Strampfer-Theater with writer Julius Rosen, which closed due to insolvency in 1884.

From 1882 to 1883, she managed to rehabilitate her image with a tour of the United States. In the following years, she performed at the Theater an der Wien, Carltheater, as well as venues in Hamburg, Berlin and Graz.

Gallmeyer was known her countless affairs and her extravagance. At times, she was considered very wealthy, but due to her immense charity she was impoverished when she died in Vienna on 3 February 1884 at the age of 46.

Her grave of honor is located in the Vienna Central Cemetery (group 32 A, number 17). In 1928, the Gallmeyergasse in Döbling was named after her.

Selected roles 

 Marion – Der preußische Landwehrmann und die französische Bäuerin (Karl Haffner)
 Sternenjungfrau – Die Sternenjungfrau (Karl Haffner). 
 Therese – Therese Krones (Karl Haffner)
 Christina – La Vie parisienne (Jacques Offenbach) 
 Lilly – Ihre Familie 
 Desvarennes – Sergius Panin (Georges Ohnet) 
 Rosa – Der Verschwender (Ferdinand Raimund). 
 Tini – Die elegante Tini (Camillo Walzel)
 Agnes – Eine leichte Person (August Conradi)

Works 
Novels

   Aus is’ (1982)

Parodies

   Die Schwestern (1982)

Dramas

   Aus purem Haß (1883)

   Sarah und Bernhard (1884)

Bibliography 
 Constantin von Wurzbach: Gallmeyer, Josephine. In Biographisches Lexikon des Kaiserthums Oesterreich. 28. Theil. Kaiserlich-königliche Hof- und Staatsdruckerei, Vienna 1874, 
 Adolph Kohut: Die größten und berühmtesten deutschen Soubretten des neunzehnten Jahrhunderts. Mit ungedruckten Briefen von Josephine Gallmeyer, Marie Geistinger, Ottilie Genée. Bagel, Düsseldorf 1890, 1885. 
 Ludwig Eisenberg: Großes biographisches Lexikon der Deutschen Bühne im XIX. Jahrhundert. Published by Paul List, Leipzig 1903, (Josephine Gallmeyer on Literature.at.
 
 E. Döbler: Josefine Gallmeyer. Thesis, University of Vienna 1935. 
 Eduard P. Danzky: Die Gallmeyer: der Roman ihres Lebens. Wancura, Wien 1953. 
 Blanka Glossy: Josefine Gallmeyer. Wiens größte Volksschauspielerin. Waldhein-Eberle, Vienna 1954. 
 
 
 Press reports
  und die Folgeseiten 2 und 3
 "Die Auferstehung der 'feschen Pepi'". Die Wochenzeitschrift Wiener Bilder zur Exhumierung Gallmeyers im Oktober 1906

External links 
  Gallmeyer Josefine on Wikisource
 Josefine Gallmeyer on Deutsche Biographie
 Josefine Gallmeyer on ZWAB
 Josefine Gallmeyer on Wien Geschischte Wiki
 Josefine Gallmeyer on OBL 

1838 births
1884 deaths
Actors from Leipzig
19th-century Austrian actresses
Austrian stage actresses
Austrian theatre directors
Theatre people from Vienna